Alexander Dmitrievich Wentzell (Александр Дмитриевич Вентцель, born 16 February 1937, Moscow) is a Russian-American mathematician.

Wentzell graduated from Moscow State University in 1958 and received in 1964 his Russian candidate degree (similar to Ph.D.) from the Steklov Institute in Moscow with advisor Eugene Dynkin.  He taught from 1961 as a docent at Moscow State University and from 1966 to 1991 as an assistant professor. In 1984 he received his Russian doctorate (higher doctoral degree)  from Moscow State University. For the academic year 1991–1992 he was a visiting professor at the University of Maryland and for the academic year 1992–93 at the University of Minnesota. Since 1993 he has been a professor at Tulane University.

His research deals with stochastic processes, probability theory, functional analysis, and partial differential equations.

In 1963 he received the Prize of the Moscow Mathematical Society. In 1978 he was an Invited Speaker at the International Congress of Mathematicians in Helsinki.

See also
Freidlin–Wentzell theorem

Selected publications
with Mark Freidlin: Random perturbations of dynamical systems, Grundlehren der mathematischen Wissenschaften 260, Springer 1984; ;

References

External links
Genealogy Tree of Dynkin's School, Department of Mathematics, Cornell University
Alexander Dmitrievich Wentzell, Eugene B. Dynkin Collection of Mathematics Interviews, Cornell Library
mathnet.ru

1937 births
Living people
20th-century American mathematicians
21st-century American mathematicians
20th-century Russian mathematicians
21st-century Russian mathematicians
Moscow State University alumni
Academic staff of Moscow State University
Tulane University faculty